The Sandrananta River is a river on the east coast of Madagascar.  Its mouth is located on the Matitanana river near the town of Andemaka in the Fitovinany region.

References

Rivers of Madagascar
Rivers of Fitovinany